Blackburn Rovers was a professional football club from East London, Eastern Cape, South Africa. The club played their home games at the Buffalo City Stadium.

The team last competed in the 2013-14 season of the National First Division, the second tier of the South African football league pyramid. The club was relegated at the end of the season to the Eastern Cape provincial division of the SAFA Second Division, after finishing bottom of the league. It wouldn't, however, go on to compete in the league following its disqualification.

Very little information exists regarding the circumstances of the club's sudden exit from football in South Africa, with the club's account on social networking platform Twitter being the only remaining trace, from the club itself, to exist.

Honours
SAFA Second Division Eastern Cape
Champions 1999-00, 2001–02, 2008–09, 2009-10 (promoted)
Runners-up 2002-03 (promoted)

References

External links
NFD Club Info
Twitter account

Defunct soccer clubs in South Africa
Association football clubs established in 1965
Association football clubs disestablished in 2014
National First Division clubs
Soccer clubs in the Eastern Cape
SAFA Second Division clubs
East London, Eastern Cape
1965 establishments in South Africa
2014 disestablishments in South Africa